Stewartville, Alabama may refer to:
Stewartville, Coosa County, Alabama, a census-designated place
Stewartville, Lauderdale County, Alabama, an unincorporated community